Kevin Mansell became the chief executive officer of Kohl's Corporation in August 2008. In addition to this promotion, he continues to serve as the President and Director of the company since February 1999. Mansell began working in retail in 1975 and started his career at Kohl's as a Divisional Merchandise Manager in 1982.

Mansell's promotion to the position of Chief Executive Officer occurred in the same year that Kohl's opened its 1,000th store. His contribution to the company was highlighted in the execution of the "only at Kohl's campaign" to collaboratively promote private label and exclusive merchandise alongside the former CEO and current chairman Larry Montgomery.

While CEO of Kohl's Corporation in 2009, Mansell earned a total compensation of $9,037,962, which included a base salary of $1,212,500, a $2,600,000 cash bonus, stocks granted of $4,161,487, options granted of $853,625, and other compensation of $210,350.

References

Living people
American retail chief executives
Year of birth missing (living people)